Helsingin Ponnistus (abbreviated Ponnistus) is a football club from Helsinki, Finland. The club was formed in 1887 making it the oldest football club in Finland. The men's first team currently plays in the Nelonen (Fourth Division) and their home ground is at the Haapaniemen Kenttä.

Background

The sports club was founded on 6 September 1887 by Viktor Damm (1864–1944) supported by 5 other young men. In its early days the club specialised in gymnastics and athletics. Nowadays football is the main sport.

The club has also been playing bandy. It was the runner-up for the bandy championship of the Finnish Workers' Sports Federation in 1948.

Ponnistus have had a variable degree of success in the Finnish football league and have participated in all four top tiers of Finnish football since the war years.  The club have played in the Mestaruussarja, which was then the top tier of Finnish football on 4 separate occasions in 1948, 1968, 1973 and as recently as 1995 in the Veikkausliiga. Each time their stay was short-lived and they were relegated back to the second tier at the end of the season.

Ponnistus have played 28 seasons covering seven periods in the Ykkönen or Suomensarja (First Division), the second tier of Finnish football in the years 1949–55, 1958–63, 1965–67, 1969–72, 1974–77, 1993–94 and 1996–97.  They also have had four spells covering 21 seasons in the third tier, the Kakkonen (Second Division), in 1978–83, 1985–92, 1998–2002 and 2005–06.

In 1995, Ponnistus won the final of Työväen Urheiluliiton Cup (Workers' Sports Federation Cup) for the first time in their history.

The highest ever attendance for a Ponnistus match was in 1968 when 6,281 people attended the home game with Lahden Reipas.

The Ladies Team gained promotion to the Women's Premier Division (Naisten SM-sarja) in 1976 but in 1977 they finished bottom of their group and were relegated. The team currently play in the Nelonen (Fourth Division).

Season to season

2010 season
Ponnistus Men's Team are competing in Section 2 (Lohko 2) of the Kolmonen (Third Division) administered by the Helsinki SPL.  This is the fourth highest tier in the Finnish football system.  In 2009 Ponnistus finished in 4th place in Section 1 (Lohko 1) of the Kolmonen.

 Ponnistus / 2 are competing in Section 2 (Lohko 2) of the Vitonen (Fifth Division) administered by the Helsinki SPL.

References and Sources
Official Website
Finnish Wikipedia
Suomen Cup
Helsingin Ponnistus Facebook

Footnotes

Bandy clubs in Finland
Football clubs in Helsinki
Association football clubs established in 1887
Bandy clubs established in 1887
1887 establishments in Finland